Pablo García González, known as Tito García (1931–2003) was a Spanish actor.

Biography
Working as a torero in his youth, he played a minor role in Pelusa (1961). After this, he intended to dedicate himself to an acting career, and came to be one of the most frequently featured supporting actor in  the Spanish cinema of the 1960s and 1970s. He often played villains in the Spaghetti Western genre of the 1960s. During his later career, during the 1980s and 1990s, he reduced his activity in cinema productions and appeared more frequently on television. He died in April 2003 aged 71.

Filmography

Films

 La quiniela (1960) as Ayudante del locutor de radio (uncredited)
 Pelusa (1960)
 Bello recuerdo (1961)
 Salto mortal (1962)
 The Awful Dr. Orlof (1962)
 Héroes de blanco (1962)
 Accidente 703 (1962) as Pedro
 The Twin Girls (1963)
 Harbor Lights (1963) as Cardinal's Man (uncredited)
 Han robado una estrella (1963) as Elías
 Duello nel Texas (1963) as Herrero (uncredited)
 Los conquistadores del Pacífico (1963)
 El llanero (1963)
 Man of the Cursed Valley (1964) as Indio
 Sonaron cuatro balazos (1964) as Jurado
 Black Angel of the Mississippi (1964) as Frank Murphy
 I gemelli del Texas (1964) as Jeff
 Bullets Don't Argue (1964) as Miguel
 La tumba del pistolero (1964) as Cochero
 Relevo para un pistolero (1964) as O'Hara
 Cavalry Charge (1964) as Fur Trader Peter Barton
 El dedo en el gatillo (1965) as Zubarri
 Fistful of Knuckles (1965) as Pablo el terrible
 Shoot to Kill (1965) as Gambler
 Wild Kurdistan (1966) as Sergeant (uncredited)
 In a Colt's Shadow (1965) as Bartender (uncredited)
 Los oficios de Cándido (1965) as Sisebuto
 Ringo's Big Night (1966) as Bandit (uncredited)
 La armada Brancaleone (1966) as Filuccio
 Seven Magnificent Guns (1966) as Abel
 Operación Goldman (1966) as Emanuel Garcia
 Rififi in Amsterdam (1966) as Ben
 The Ugly Ones (1966) as Zacarías
 The Tough One (1966)
 Up the MacGregors (1967) as Miguelito
 I'll Kill Him and Return Alone (1967) as Francisco (uncredited)
 Misión en Ginebra (1967) as Mac
 O.K. Yevtushenko (1967) as Capt. Milhavikah
 God Forgives... I Don't! (1967) as Tam-Tam
 Una ladrona para un espía (1967) as Colombiano
 Escuela de enfermeras (1968)
 Un tren para Durango (1968) as Pedrp Arista (uncredited)
 Crónica de un atraco (1969) as Fred Mulligan
 Go for Broke (1969) as Carranza's Man
 I Live for Your Death (1968) as Bit Part (uncredited)
 Operación Mata Hari (1968)
 No somos de piedra (1968) as Cliente de la farmacia
 Llego, veo, disparo (1968) as Corpulent member of Garrito's horde
 Uno a uno, sin piedad (1968) as farmer
 The Mercenary (1968) as Garcia's Cousin (uncredited)
 Tiempos de Chicago (1969) as Turi (uncredited)
 América rugiente (1969) as Prison Warden Charlie
 El taxi de los conflictos (1969) as Policía casado
 Dead Are Countless (1969) as Ted (uncredited)
 A Bullet for Sandoval (1969) as Mexican Rancher (uncredited)
 Boot Hill (1969) as Finch Henchman Wrestling with the Two Dwarfs (uncredited)
 El corsario (1970)
 Sabata the Killer (1970) as Fuller
 La salamandra del desierto (1970)
 El gran crucero (1970)
 La Lola, dicen que no vive sola (1970) as Encargado Grandes Almacenes (uncredited)
 Compañeros (1970) as Pepito Tigrero (uncredited)
 Palabra de Rey (1970, Short)
 La otra residencia (1970) as Dueño del bar
 El apartamento de la tentación (1971) as Asistente de Barami
 A Town Called Hell (1971) as Malhombre
 Los corsarios (1971)
 The Light at the Edge of the World (1971) as Emilio
 Aunque la hormona se vista de seda... (1971)
 Catlow (1971) as Pedro
 Las ibéricas F.C. (1971)
 Blindman (1971) as Train Engineer (uncredited)
 Bad Man's River (1971)
 Kill! Kill! Kill! Kill! (1971) as Spyros Bizanthios
 Don't Turn the Other Cheek (1971) as Holdup-Man (uncredited)
 Vente a ligar al Oeste (1972)
 Fabulous Trinity (1972) as Charles Wesley alias Ponzio Trinidad
 La cabina (1972, TV Short) as Señor corpulento
 Fat Brothers of Trinity (1973) as Charles
 The Scarlet Letter (1973) as Church Attendant
 Die zweite Ermordung des Hundes (1973, TV Movie) as Kraftprotz
 Yankee Dudler (1973)
 Bell from Hell (1973) as Don Pedro's Hunting Partner
 Shanghai Joe (1973) as Jesus, Slave Trader (uncredited)
 The Spikes Gang (1974) as Mexican Man (uncredited)
 Joe y Margerito (1974) as Acidumuriatico
 Chicas de alquiler (1974) as Cosme
 Dick Turpin (1974) as Mesonero
 Onofre (1974)
 La mortaja (1974)
 Shoot First... Ask Questions Later (1975) as Watson Brother
 Zorro (1975) as Chicken Vendor (uncredited)
 Who's Afraid of Zorro (1975) as Capitaine Duval
 Bienvenido, Mister Krif (1975)
 Leonor (1975)
 Solo ante el Streaking (1975) as Pedro
 El poder del deseo (1975) as Barman
 School of Death (1975)
 El libro de buen amor II (1976) as Don Carnal
 Y le llamaban Robin Hood (1976)
 Alcalde por elección (1976)
 Haz la loca... no la guerra (1976) as Pepe
 Caperucita y Roja (1977)
 El puente (1977) as Camarero racista
 Eva, limpia como los chorros del oro (1977) as Carnicero
 The Pyjama Girl Case (1978) as The fat man in the final foursome (uncredited)
 Un aventurero de via estrecha (1978)
 El terrorista (1978) as Dueño del bar
 Madrid al desnudo (1979) as Juanito (as Tito Garcia)
 Supersonic Man (1979) as Joe
 Los energéticos (1979) as Cura
 El alcalde y la política (1980) as Concejal
 The Beasts' Carnival (1980) as Compinche de El Palanqueta
 La guerra de los niños (1980) as Guardián
 Duelo del Dragón y el Tigre (1980) as Boss
 La enfermera, el marica y el cachondo de Don Pepino (1981) as Giuseppe
 Queremos un hijo tuyo (1981) as Hermano de Martirio
 Night of the Werewolf (1981) as First thief
 Black Jack (1981)
 La segunda guerra de los niños (1981) as Lucio
 Han violado a una mujer (1982) as Dueño del restaurante (uncredited)
 Los autonómicos (1982) as Colás
 Las noches secretas de Lucrecia Borgia (1982) as Grinta
 Piernas arriba (1982) as Tito
 Al este del oeste (1984) as Tafford, Blacksmith
 Divinas palabras (1987)
 Soldadito español (1988) as Sargento
 Don Juan, mi querido fantasma (1990) as Celador 1
 Seducción mortal (1990) as Gacho
 El robobo de la jojoya (1991) as Fran
 Something of Mine (1991) as Young Victim
 The Naked Target (1992) as Camionero 1
 El beso del sueño (1992) as El General
 Colón pirata (1992, TV Movie)
 No Smoking (1993, TV Movie)
 Belmonte (1995) as Picador 'El Brillante'
 África (1996) as Encargado del mercado
 The Dancer Upstairs (2002) as Admiral Prado
 800 Bullets (2002) as Tonito (final film role)

TV series

References

External links

1931 births
2003 deaths
Spanish male film actors
Male Spaghetti Western actors
Spanish male telenovela actors